Kateryna Babkina (born 22 July 1985) is a Ukrainian poet, short story writer, novelist, playwright and screenwriter. The winner of Angelus Central European Literature Award (2021).

Career
Babkina was born in Ivano-Frankivsk, Ukraine in 1985. She attended Taras Shevchenko National University of Kyiv to study journalism and graduated in 2007, going on to work as a freelance journalist.

She worked as a contributing editor for Esquire in Ukraine (2012-2014). She also has had articles published in Focus, Business and Le Monde amongst others.

Kateryna was the first Ukrainian author to have her readings at the Library of Congress, USA.

Her book My Grandfather Danced the Best won the 2021 Angelus Award. In 2022, Kateryna’s novella for children “Cappy and the Whale” was published in translation by Penguin Random House, UK.

Published work

Poetry
 St Elmo's Fire (2002)
 The Mustard (2011)
 Painkillers and Sleeping Pills (2014)
 Charmed for Love (2017)
 Does not hurt (2021)

Short story collections
 Lilu After You (2008)
 Schaslyvi holi lyudy (Happy Naked People) (2016)

Novels
 Sonia (2013)
 My Grandfather Danced the Best (2019)

Screenplays
 Evil, as part of the 2013 Kinofest NYC festival

Plays
 Hamlet.Babylon (2016), an adaptation of Shakespeare's Hamlet

Children's stories
 Harbuzovyi rik (The Pumpkin Year) (2014)
 Шапочка і кит (The Hat and the Whale) (2015)
 Girls's power (2018, co-authored with Mark Livin)
 Snow heaty (2022)

Translated books
 poetry collection Ask for the same for all (Haver Laet Publishing House, Israel)
 novel Sonia (Warsztaty Kultury, Poland)
 novel Heute Fahre Ich nach Morgen (Haymon Verlag, Austria)
 a collection of short stories Szczęśliwi nadzy ludzie (Warsztaty Kultury Publishing House, Poland)
 short story collection Happy naked people (VINTAGEbooks, Cyprus)
 novel Nikt tak nie tańczył jak mój dziadek (Warsztaty Kultury Publishing House, Poland)
 novella for children Cappy and the Whale (Penguin Random House, UK)

References

External links
 Interview in The Odessa Review
 Interview in Ukrainian Jewish Encounter

Ukrainian writers
Ukrainian journalists
Ukrainian women novelists
Ukrainian children's writers
1985 births
Living people